The Millage Farm Rural Historic District in Phillips County, Colorado near Haxtun, Colorado, is a  farm which was listed on the National Register of Historic Places in 2013.

The district includes nine contributing buildings, ten contributing structures, one contributing site, and two contributing objects.

References

Historic districts on the National Register of Historic Places in Colorado
Phillips County, Colorado
Farms in Colorado